The Xiliao or West Liao River is a river in Inner Mongolia and Liaoning province, in northeast China. Its source is the Xilamulun River in Inner Mongolia. It is one of the headwaters of the Liao River.

The Xiliao or "Western Liao River", historically also known as Huang River, is the largest tributary of the Liao River. The 
The Xiliao River is formed by the confluence of the Laoha River flowing from the southwest, and the Xar Moron River flowing from the west. The entire course of the Xiliao runs eastward within Inner Mongolia.

Archaeology

Various Neolithic cultures have been identified in the Xiliao River region. Broomcorn millet and foxtail millet were the main cereal crops, while pigs and dogs were the main domesticated animals found at Neolithic archaeological sites.

Xiaohexi culture 小河西文化 (9,000-8,500 BP)
Xinglongwa culture 兴隆洼文化 (8,200-7,400 BP)
Zhaobaogou culture 赵宝沟文化 (7,500-6,500 BP)
Fuhe culture 富河文化 (7,200-7,000 BP)
Hongshan culture 红山文化 (6,500-5,000 BP)
Xiaoheyan culture 小河沿文化‎ (5,000-4,000 BP)

Bronze Age cultures of the Xiliao River region are:

Lower Xiajiadian culture 夏家店下层文化 (4,000-3,200 BP)
Upper Xiajiadian culture 夏家店上层文化 (3,200-2,600 BP)

References

Rivers of Inner Mongolia